Down to Earth is the debut album by Monie Love, which was released on 30 October 1990, on Warner Bros. Records. It peaked at 109 on the Billboard 200 and at 26 on the Top R&B/Hip-Hop Albums, and spawned three charting singles. "It's a Shame (My Sister)" became Monie's only top-40 hit in the U.S., and peaked at 26 on the Billboard Hot 100, while "Monie in the Middle" and "Down 2 Earth" were both successful on the R&B and hip hop charts.

Critical reception
In a contemporary review for The Village Voice, music critic Robert Christgau gave Down to Earth an "A−" and was impressed by Love's proud sensibilities, as she "radiates sisterhood even though she concentrates on the guys, and positivity and tradition" without much culturally or politically conscious lyrics. Alex Henderson was less enthusiastic in a retrospective review for AllMusic, in which he gave the album three-and-a-half out of five stars and wrote that Love raps well, but lacks worthwhile stories on an otherwise good album.

At the 33rd Grammy Awards, "Monie in the Middle" was nominated for Best Rap Solo Performance, but lost to MC Hammer's "U Can't Touch This." The following year at the 34th Grammy Awards, she was nominated for Best Rap Solo Performance again for "It's a Shame (My Sister)" but lost to LL Cool J's "Mama Said Knock You Out."

Track listing
 "Monie in the Middle" (Monie Love, Steele) 3:45   
 "It's a Shame (My Sister)" (Garrett, Monie Love, Wonder; sample Performed by Love, True Image; additional vocals by Ultra Naté) 3:43
 "Don't Funk wid the Mo" (Callendar, Hall, Maxwell) 3:33
 "Ring My Bell" (Fermie, Monie Love) 3:52
 "R U Single" (Callendar, Hall, Maxwell) 4:07
 "Just Don't Give a Damn" (Callendar, Hall, Maxwell) 3:57    
 "What I'm Supposed 2 B" (Callendar) 3:49
 "Dettrimentally Stable" (Callendar, Hall, Maxwell) 3:28 
 "Down 2 Earth" (Callendar, Hall, Maxwell) 4:03
 "I Do as I Please" (Monie Love, Steele) 3:53     
 "Pups Lickin' Bone" (Monie Love, Tineo) 4:00
 "Read Between the Lines" (Callendar, Hall, Maxwell) 3:50     
 "Race Against Reality" (Callendar, Maxwell, Love, Hall) 3:03
 "Swiney Swiney" (Callendar, Maxwell, Love, Hall) 3:12
 "Give It 2 U Like This" (Callendar, Maxwell, Love, Hall) 4:03
 "I Can Do This (Uptown Mix)" (Pogo, Sylvers, Love, Shockley, Shellby) 3:24
 "I'm Driving You Crazy" (Steele, Love) 4:16
 "Grandpa's Party" (Love II Love Remix) (Love, Fermie) 5:49

Note: Tracks 7, 13, 15, 16, and 17 were included in the UK edition but omitted from the U.S. edition.

Samples
"Monie in the Middle"
"Black Grass" by Bad Bascomb
"Willie Whopper" by Willie Colón
"I Wouldn't Change a Thing" by Coke Escovedo
"I Can Do This (Uptown Mix)"
"And The Beat Goes On" by The Whispers
"It's a Shame (My Sister)"
"It's a Shame" by The Spinners, written by Stevie Wonder
"R U Single"
"Single Life" by Cameo
"Just Don't Give a Damn"
"Who Knows" by Jimi Hendrix
"The Soil I Tilled for You" by The Shades of Brown
"What I'm Supposed 2 B"
"N.T." by Kool and the Gang
"Eric B. Is President" by Eric B. & Rakim
"Feel Good" by Fancy
"Dettrimentally Stable"
"Ball of Confusion (That's What the World Is Today)" by The Temptations
"Down 2 Earth"
"Hey Uh-What You Say Come On" by Roy Ayers Ubiquity
"Shangri La" by La Pregunta
"I Wouldn't Change a Thing" by Coke Escovedo
"Pups Lickin' Bone"
"Good Old Music" by Funkadelic
"Read Between the Lines"
"I Like (What You're Doing to Me)" by Young & Company
"Take This Train to Freedom" by New Birth
"Race Against Reality"
"Kitty Bey" by Byron Morris & Unity
"Swiney Swiney"
"Advice" by Sly & the Family Stone

Charts

Weekly charts

Year-end charts

References

External links
 

1990 debut albums
Monie Love albums
Warner Records albums
Chrysalis Records albums